The Version 2.0 World Tour was the second world concert tour cycle by American/Scottish alternative rock group Garbage, which took the band throughout North America, Europe, South Africa, Asia and Australia in support of its second album Version 2.0.

Garbage performed under the alias Stupid Girl for the first three shows on the tour, referencing their 1996 hit single of the same name. The Version 2.0 tour took in headline performances, support performances for Red Hot Chili Peppers and Alanis Morissette, and slots at rock festivals and radio shows around the world.

A number of notable acts supported Garbage throughout the run of the tour, including Placebo, Moloko, Talvin Singh, Stellar*, Lit, Rasmus, Crystal Method and Laurent Garnier to various reception.

Itinerary
Preempting the start of their world tour, Garbage played three shows in the Midwest under the alias 'Stupid Girl'. The Version 2.0 tour officially kicked off with club dates starting at San Francisco's Warfield Theatre on May 20, and took the band to a number of key media cities in the United States and Canada. Garbage then travelled to Europe to play a number of rock festivals beginning June 1 at Netherlands' Pinkpop and finishing up at Scotland's T in the Park on July 12. In between the festivals, Garbage performed some headlining shows in France and the United Kingdom, with support coming from The Crystal Method. In August, the band travelled to Japan to perform on the bill at the Fuji Rock Festival, and then back to Scotland to perform at two "warm up" shows at Glasgow's Barrowland Ballroom and then headlining the last night of the Reading Festival.

Garbage returned to North America on September 17, to start a three-month tour. Support came from Girls Against Boys. The itinerary took the band from Denver, Colorado up the West Coast as north as Vancouver, British Columbia before routing towards the Southern States. Following these dates, the tour moved up the Eastern Seaboard and into Quebec and Ontario, before finishing up in the Midwest on November 28 in Green Bay, Wisconsin. During December, Garbage performed at radio shows on both coasts, including KROQ-FM's Almost Acoustic Christmas, and made a visit to Mexico City before wrapping up on December 20 in Detroit, Michigan.

Continuing their touring commitment into 1999, Garbage launched a European arena tour on January 14 at Dublin's Point Theatre. Local acts such as Laurent Garnier and Rasmus support continental dates; Moloko support Irish and UK shows. Concerts in Paris and St. Petersburg are filmed to be broadcast by MTV Europe and MTV Russia respectively. A show in Tallinn is cancelled on the day when the band's equipment is held up by customs officials at the Estonian border. The European run ends in Madrid on February 11. Garbage then returned to North America to support Alanis Morissette on two legs of The Junkie tour, starting on February 16 in Cincinnati routing along the Midwest, Four Corners states and onto the West Coast, ending on April 8 in Los Angeles

Garbage revisited Europe to play a second summer of rock festivals, beginning with Vienna's Libro on May 19. The shows included visits to Israel and Iceland, although four concerts in the Baltic States and Russia are cancelled on the advice of the American Embassy due to the USA's involvement in Kosovo. Garbage headlined a special show to mark the opening of the Scottish Parliament in Edinburgh on July 1. The European dates conclude in Duisburg on July 25. Garbage then travelled to South Africa to play four shows with Placebo.

The final legs of the Version 2.0 tour see Garbage moving on to New Zealand and Australia to co-headline with Alanis Morissette, beginning in Auckland for sixteen days from Oct 1, and ending in Newcastle. During this time the band also performed at the Livid Festival. Garbage returned to North America to wind down the tour by headlining a series of shows organised by MTV on university campuses. Titled the Campus Invasion Tour, and supported by Lit, the shows began on October 20 in Denver and is routed through the Midwest, North East and Southern States, Arizona and California. The final date of the Version 2.0 tour is held in Irvine, California on November 24.

Opening acts 

Talvin Singh (North America – leg 1 select dates)
The Crystal Method (Europe – leg 1 only UK)
Moloko (Europe – leg 3)
Girls Against Boys (North America – leg 3)
Placebo (Africa)
Stellar* (Oceania)
Lit (North America – leg 6)

Setlists

Tour dates

Festival and others miscellaneous performances

 Performing as "Stupid Girl"
 Radio festival performances
 Supporting Alanis Morissette on The Junkie tour

a Garbage's equipment was held at the Russian-Estonian border by customs, and the show was cancelled at the last minute. Garbage appeared on Estonian news programmes criticising the Russian customs, and promised the show would be rescheduled
b Garbage had announced the above four dates on March 25, 1999, as part of that year's European summer schedule, including a show in Estonia, but by April 16 were cancelled on the advice of the U.S. Embassy due to concerns caused by the NATO bombing of the Federal Republic of Yugoslavia during the Kosovo War. The U.S. Embassy had felt there was "Anti-American sentiment in some areas". The dates were not rescheduled.

Cancellations and rescheduled shows

Box office score data

Promotional performances

References

External links
Garbage official website

1998 concert tours
1999 concert tours
Garbage (band) concert tours